Gregory W. Henry is an astronomer and research scientist for Tennessee State University. In 1999, Henry led one of two teams that discovered the first transiting extrasolar planet, HD 209458 b. The other team was led by David Charbonneau.

Henry was also involved in the discovery of HD 149026 b.  This discovery was important in understanding how planets form and supports solar nebula accretion mode.

External links
Henry's TSU home page

Year of birth missing (living people)
Living people
American astronomers
Tennessee State University faculty
Place of birth missing (living people)